The 2019–20 FA Trophy (known for sponsorship reasons as the Buildbase FA Trophy) was the 51st season of the FA Trophy, an annual football competition for teams at levels 5-8 of the English National League System.  The competition consisted of two preliminary rounds, three qualifying rounds, and six proper rounds.  All matches until the semi-finals were held as a single-match knockout format with reversed replays after first-leg matches drawn in regulation time.  The semi-finals were scheduled to be two-legged, but due to their delay by the COVID-19 pandemic in the United Kingdom they were shifted to single matches, with no replays. The final was a single-match held at Wembley Stadium and decided in extra time or penalties if tied after regulation.  First-leg ties throughout the competition could be decided by extra time or penalties if both teams agree and notify the referee at least 45 minutes before kickoff, in accordance with FA Trophy Rule 11(a).

The competition was paused at the semi-final stage due to the COVID-19 pandemic. The competition resumed in September 2020,

Calendar
The calendar for the 2019–20 Buildbase FA Trophy, as announced by The Football Association.

Extra preliminary round

Preliminary round

First Round Qualifying

Second Round Qualifying

Third round Qualifying

First Round Proper

Second Round Proper

Third round Proper

Fourth round Proper

Semi-finals
Originally scheduled for March 2020, the two-legged semi-finals were postponed due to the COVID-19 pandemic. The FA declared their intention to complete the tournament, but with an uncertain timeframe.  In late August 2020, they scheduled the semi-finals as single matches in September, with a date of 27 September for the final at Wembley. The final, alongside the FA Vase final held as part of the same event, was to be among the matches trialling the return of spectators to elite football after the height of the first wave of the pandemic in the UK, but this was further postponed following new restrictions on gatherings in England that were enacted on 14 September 2020 as COVID-19 cases increased.

Final

The final was rescheduled for 27 September 2020 however this was postponed as the FA hoped to have spectators in the final. The date was then agreed for 3 May 2021 behind closed doors as a suitable solution could not be reached to be played with fans.

Notes

References

External links

FA Trophy seasons
FA Trophy
2019–20 in English football
FA Trophy